Tamandarë (Brazilian Portuguese: Tamandaré; Old Tupi: Tamandûaré, lit.

Geography

 State - Pernambuco
 Region - Zona da mata Pernambucana
 Boundaries - Rio Formoso and Sirinhaém  (N);  Barreiros  (S);  Água Preta  (W); Atlantic Ocean   (E)
 Area - 
 Elevation - 8 m
 Vegetation - Coconut trees and Atlantic forest
 Clima - Hot tropical and humid
 Annual average temperature - 25.3 c
 Distance to Recife - 103 km

The municipality contains part of the strictly protected Saltinho Biological Reserve, a  conservation unit created in 1983.

Beaches

Tamandaré beach
Urbanized, has two kilometers long of sand and a number of tourist facilities. Has small waves and fine sand. Easy to reach from Recife and Caruaru.

Boca da Barra beach
At low tide is formed natural pools. Suitable for swimming, has a dense mangrove vegetation in the estuary of Canoa quebrada River. Its possible to reach the Mamocambilhas beach in Barreiros by walking.

Campas beach
Three kilometers long, is good for swimming, and in front of the Marinas hotel, the sea allows natural anchorages of boats. It is possible to rent equipment such as jetski, banana boats and boats.

Carneiros beach
Still almost deserted, just has a few summer houses and bars. It has five kilometers of landscape mixed between the reefs, coconut trees and low waves water.

Economy

The main economic activities in Tamandaré are based in tourism, artisanal fishing, food and beverage industry and agriculture especially coconuts.

Economic Indicators

Economy by Sector
2006

Health Indicators

References

Populated coastal places in Pernambuco
Beaches of Brazil
Municipalities in Pernambuco